Pierre Robert Joseph (Alfred) Quidant (7 December 1815 – 9 October 1893) was a French pianist, composer and music teacher.

Biography
Born in Lyon, the son of a merchant of musical instruments, he began studying music and piano in his hometown. In 1831, he went to study at the Conservatoire de Paris, but interrupted his studies to work for Sébastien Érard as piano demonstrator, a job that he held for more than thirty years.

Quidant wrote mainly salon music, which became popular during his time. His pupils include Conrad Ansorge, Arthur de Greef, and Emil von Sauer.

He died in Paris.

Quidant had a son named R. Alfred Quidant (1856–1933).

Selected works
 La Fête au village, grande valse
 Fantaisie, en forme de valse chromatique
 Cantique, ou Fantaisie de Salon, Op. 13 
 Mazeppa, grande étude-galop, Op. 21
 Grande étude-valse, Op. 29
 La Marche de l'Univers, fantaisie, Op. 34
 L'Horloge à musique, caprice, Op. 35

References

External links

1815 births
1893 deaths
19th-century classical composers
19th-century French male classical pianists
19th-century French composers
Conservatoire de Paris alumni
French male classical composers
French Romantic composers
Musicians from Lyon